J'attendrai le suivant... (I'll Wait for the Next One...) is a 2002 French short film directed by Philippe Orreindy. Lasting only four minutes, the film takes place almost entirely on a metro train.

The film was released in France in September 2002, with subsequent screenings at various film festivals followed by releases around the world. At the 75th Academy Awards, the film was nominated for Best Short Film, but did not win.

Synopsis 
A man on a crowded metro train announces that he has an announcement to make to the people in his train car. At first glance, it appears that the other passengers mistake the man for a typical train entertainer. But the man says that he is simply looking for love. He states that his name is Antoine and that he is 29 years old, and adds that he is well off, educated, and athletic and that he is tired of living a tedious life of solitude and is looking for someone to share life's precious moments with. After a long speech (and brief debate with another male passenger), the man says that any interested women should get off at the next stop. A woman, who earlier had forlornly watched an embracing couple on an escalator in the metro and has now been shown smiling throughout the man's speech, promptly stands up as soon as the train slows down, and steps off to the platform. Obviously excited, she is waiting for the man to step off to join her. As she stares his way, the man tells her through the closing train door, "Miss, it was only a skit..." The train doors shut and train speeds off, leaving the woman standing alone and dejected on the platform. At the end the screen goes black and the man says "thank you for watching" before asking passengers for money. It appears that, after all, he is not the man he pretended to be but rather a homeless beggar performing for money on the metro.

Cast 
Sophie Forte - La jeune femme
Thomas Gaudin - L'homme
Pascal Casanova - Le comparse

Awards and nominations

References

2000s French-language films
2002 films
French short films
Rail transport films
European Film Awards winners (films)